Mario Šuver (born 23 September 1999) is a professional footballer who plays as a centre-back for  club Borussia Dortmund II. Born in Germany, he has represented Croatia at youth level.

Club career
Šuver made his professional debut for 1. FC Nürnberg in the 2. Bundesliga on 10 May 2021, coming on as a substitute in the 84th minute for Tom Krauß against Hamburger SV. The away match finished as a 5–2 loss for Nürnberg.

On 12 June 2022, Šuver signed with Borussia Dortmund II.

International career
Šuver made four appearances for the Croatia national under-17 team in January and February 2016.

Personal life
Šuver was born in Stuttgart, Baden-Württemberg.

References

External links
 
 
 

1999 births
Living people
Footballers from Stuttgart
German people of Croatian descent
Association football central defenders
German footballers
Croatian footballers
Croatia youth international footballers
Stuttgarter Kickers players
VfB Stuttgart II players
1. FC Nürnberg II players
1. FC Nürnberg players
Borussia Dortmund II players
Regionalliga players
2. Bundesliga players
3. Liga players